Clambus armadillo is a species of minute beetle in the family Clambidae. It is found in Europe and Northern Asia (excluding China) and North America.

References

Further reading

External links

 

Scirtoidea
Articles created by Qbugbot
Beetles described in 1774
Taxa named by Charles De Geer